The 1993 U.S. Olympic Festival was held from July 23 to August 1, 1993 in San Antonio, Texas. It was the twelfth edition of the junior multi-sport event held in the United States by the United States Olympic Committee.

Statistics
Statistics for event:
 3,500 athletes attending
 125 Olympians attending
 Total sports:  37
 1,517 credentials issued
 30 hours of TV coverage on TNT and prime network stations
 19,000 volunteers

The festival opened on July 23, 1993 with the opening ceremonies at the Alamodome to a crowd of 62,702 and would continue for ten days.

Event locations

Notable athletes

Athlete housing locations

References

US Olympic Festival
United States
Olympic festival
Sports festivals in the United States
US Olympic Festival
Sports in San Antonio
US Olympic Festival
United States Olympic Committee
Festivals in San Antonio